Lazarus Muhoni (born 31 August 1976) is a retired Zimbabwean football midfielder. A Zimbabwe international, he played at the 2003 COSAFA Cup and the 2004 African Cup of Nations.

References 

1976 births
Living people
Zimbabwean footballers
Zimbabwe international footballers
Association football midfielders
Black Rhinos F.C. players
Dynamos F.C. players